Service was an independent record label formed in Gothenburg, Sweden in December 2001 by Ola Borgström together with Dan Lissvik. In 2012 Borgström announced that the label would stop issuing new material.

Service was often called Sweden's most important record label and has, in spite of its underground character, been influential for Swedish music in the 21st century.

Bands and artists 

The Embassy
Franke
Ikons
Jackpot
Lake Heartbeat
Jens Lekman
The Tough Alliance
Erik de Vahl
The Whitest Boy Alive

Catalog

References

External links
Official website

See also
 List of record labels

Swedish independent record labels
2001 establishments in Sweden
2013 disestablishments in Sweden
Companies based in Gothenburg